Bugurnidja is an Australian Aboriginal language of Arnhem Land in northern Australia. Almost nothing is known of it; apparently Nicholas Evans collected some data from a single speaker, and this showed similarities to Ngomburr.

References

Darwin Region languages
Extinct languages of the Northern Territory